The Grand Tours are the three most prestigious multi-week stage races in professional road bicycle racing. The competitions are the Giro d'Italia, Tour de France and Vuelta a España, contested annually in that order. They are the only stage races permitted to last longer than 14 days. No cyclist has won all three Grand Tours's mountains classifications in the same year; the only cyclists to win all three Grand Tours's mountains classifications in their career are Federico Bahamontes and Luis Herrera. It is rare for cyclists to ride all Grand Tours in the same year; in 2004, 474 cyclists started in one of the Grand Tours, 68 rode two and two cyclists started all three.

Cyclists are ranked on the basis of their total wins in the three Grand Tours. When there is a tie between cyclists they are listed alphabetically by the Grand Tour they won. The majority of winners have come from Europe, however there have been a few notable victories for cyclists from other continents. Colombia, Australia, Mexico, the United States, and Venezuela are the only non-European countries to have a rider win a mountains classification, with twenty-two victories shared between the five countries.

Bahamontes and Gino Bartali, with 9 victories, have won the most mountains classifications at the Grand Tours. Lucien Van Impe is third with 8 and Richard Virenque is fourth with seven. Virenque has won the most mountains classifications at the Tour, with seven. Bartali, with seven, holds the record mountains classifications at the Giro. While, José Luis Laguía both have five victories in the mountains classification at the Vuelta.

Winners

By cyclist
Riders in bold are still active. Number of wins in gold indicates the current record holder(s).

By country

See also 
 Climbing specialist
 Mountains classification in the Tour de France
 Mountains classification in the Giro d'Italia
 Mountains classification in the Vuelta a España

References

General

Specific

Lists of cyclists
Grand Tour (cycling)